Middletown Unified School District is a school district located in Lake County, California.

Schools
Middletown Unified School District contains the following schools.

Elementary schools
Cobb Mountain Elementary School
Coyote Valley Elementary School
Minnie Cannon Elementary School

Middle schools
Middletown Middle School

High schools
Loconoma Valley High School
Middletown High School

Community Day Schools
Middletown Community Day School
Middletown Elementary Community Day School

References

Education in Lake County, California
School districts in California